Southeast Webster-Grand Community School District is a rural public school district headquartered in Burnside, Iowa. It, along with Prairie Valley Community School District, operates under the name Southeast Valley  and they are the Jaguars. The district occupies sections of Boone and Webster counties, with a small portion in Greene County. It serves Boxholm, Dayton, Fraser, Harcourt, Lehigh, and Pilot Mound.

The district shares Southeast Valley High School.

History
It was established on July 1, 2005, by the merger of the Grand Community School District and the Southeast Webster Community School District.

In August 2014, the district began a whole grade-sharing arrangement with the Prairie Valley Community School District as a way to deal with smaller enrollments and as a way to save money. The two districts together share middle and high schools.

Schools
 Dayton Center, Dayton
 Southeast Webster-Grand Southeast Valley Middle School, Burnside (operated with Prairie Valley Community School District)
 Southeast Valley High School, Gowrie (operated with Prairie Valley Community School District)

See also
List of school districts in Iowa

References

External links
 Southeast Valley Schools (joint website of Southeast Webster-Grand CSD and Prairie Valley CSD)
 
 Southeast Valley grade-sharing agreement
School districts in Iowa
Education in Boone County, Iowa
Education in Greene County, Iowa
Education in Webster County, Iowa
2005 establishments in Iowa
School districts established in 2005